Henri "Harry" Gerard Vriend (born 20 May 1938) is a former water polo player from the Netherlands, who competed at the 1960 and 1964 Summer Olympics; in both games he finished in eighth position with the Dutch Men's Team. His brother Wim played alongside Harry at the 1964 games.

On 4 October 1963, Vriend married the Dutch swimmer Lenie de Nijs. He subsequently became a water polo coach and served as the head coach of the men's national team. Vriend later worked for NOS Studio Sport, a Dutch TV program, as a commentator.

References

1938 births
Living people
Dutch male water polo players
Olympic water polo players of the Netherlands
Water polo players at the 1960 Summer Olympics
Water polo players at the 1964 Summer Olympics
Water polo players from Amsterdam
20th-century Dutch people